Ukuriguma is a Papuan language of Papua New Guinea.

References

External links
 Ukuriguma Swadesh List

Numagen languages
Languages of Madang Province